Abraham Danielsson Hülphers (1704–1770), also known as Abraham Hülphers the Older, was a Swedish early industrialist, and politician.

Managing several iron works and forges around Bergslagen, he was an important contributor to the development of the early industrial craft production in Sweden. While maintaining extensive commercial enterprises around his home town Västerås, he was also active in the Swedish East India Company, bringing new products to the Swedish market, including tobacco, textiles and wine.

He attended the Riksdag of Sweden five times during 1740–1765, representing the bourgeoisie estate for the Caps party during the Age of Liberty.

Biography
Abraham Danielsson Hülphers was born in 1704 in Hedemora, Dalarna, as a son of the milliner Daniel Johansson Hülphers, and Catharina (née Torpensis).

On his paternal side, his great-grandfather was the ironmaster Hans Hilper, who immigrated to Nyköping circa 1625 from Schmalkalden, Holy Roman Empire. On his maternal side, his great-grandfathers included Petrus Petri Torpensis, and Anders Angerstein. In addition, he was descendant five times removed of Olaus Canuti Helsingius, and Stephanus Olai Bellinus. He was also a cousin of Nils Hülphers.

He married Christina (née Westdahl), daughter of the businessman and politician Lars Olofsson Westdahl in Västerås. Together they had 13 children, among them the musicologist Abraham Hülphers the Younger.

After an initial sejour in Stockholm, he settled permanently in Västerås where he was granted commercial privileges, followed by incremental investments alongside political duties.

Besides his commercial interests, he also undertook municipal duties as judge at the city court of Västerås, and attended the Riksdag of Sweden five times during 1740–1765, representing the bourgeoisie estate for the Caps party during the Age of Liberty, which expanded Sweden's economic freedom as well as introduced the world's oldest constitutional implementation of freedom of the press.

With reputed interest in and patronage for the arts and humanities, extending beyond that of his family circles, he issued some 25 000 copper Swedish riksdaler with annual rent designated for widows of Västerås.

Abraham Danielsson Hülphers died in 1770. He was buried in Västerås Cathedral in the tomb of bishop Olaus Stephani Bellinus, situated between the royal benches, which he as descendant was granted access to upon request in 1751. An epitaph by the royal sculptor at Stockholm Palace Johan Ljung (1717–1787) was erected in tribute by his issue in 1772, "crowned with the arms of Hülphers surrounded by a caduceus and fasces, symbols for commercial and political duties, as well as two cornucopias, mellifluous with coins and wine grapes."

References

Bibliography
 Abraham Danielsson Hülphers (p. 42–43) in Tema 1700-talet by Sven Olsson (1914–2006); :sv:Västmanlands läns museum
 Graf-skrifter wid herr rådman Abraham Hülphers jorde-färd i Wästerås dom-kyrka den 13 decemb. 1770. Wästerås (1770; Print: Johan Laur. Horrn)

1704 births
1770 deaths
People from Hedemora
Swedish industrialists
Swedish East India Company people
18th-century Swedish businesspeople
Members of the Riksdag of the Estates
Municipal commissioners of Sweden
Swedish philanthropists
18th-century Swedish politicians
Swedish ironmasters
18th-century philanthropists